The Gramophone Company Limited (The Gramophone Co. Ltd.), based in the United Kingdom and founded by Emil Berliner, was one of the early recording companies, the parent organisation for the His Master's Voice (HMV) label, and the European affiliate of the American Victor Talking Machine Company. Although the company merged with the Columbia Graphophone Company in 1931 to form Electric and Musical Industries Limited (EMI), its name "The Gramophone Company Limited" continued in the UK into the 1970s.

History 
The Gramophone Company was founded in April 1898 by William Barry Owen and Edmund Trevor Lloyd Wynne Williams, commissioned by Emil Berliner, in London, England. 

Owen was acting as agent for Emile Berliner, inventor of the gramophone record, whilst Williams provided the finances. Most of the company's early discs were made in Hanover, Germany at a plant operated  by members of Berliner's family, though it had operations around the world.

In 1898, Fred Gaisberg moved from the U.S. to London to set up the first disc recording studio in Europe; it was situated in Maiden Lane. Among early artists he recorded was Syria Lamont, an Australian soprano whose single "Coming through the Rye" was one of the first ever issued. In December 1900, Owen gained the manufacturing rights for the Lambert Typewriter Company, and the Gramophone Company was for a few years renamed the Gramophone & Typewriter Ltd.  This was an attempt to diversify the business model, in response to a series of lawsuits by Edison Bell.

Lawsuits
The Berliner Gramophone Company was hit the hardest with a lawsuit that involved a former employee, Frank Seaman. Berliner had hired Seaman, part of The National Gramophone Company, to handle the distribution of record players and disk as an exclusive sales agent. In secret, he started producing a product inferior to the Gramophone, which he called the Zonophone and began solely marketing that instead of the gramophone. Berliner cancelled his contract with The National Gramophone Company, and in turn was sued for breach of contract. 

In 1900, the U.S. parent of Gramophone lost a patent infringement suit brought on by Columbia Records and Zonophone, and was no longer permitted to produce records in the U.S. 

The agreement allowed Columbia to produce disc records themselves in the United States, which they began doing in 1901, with the UK Gramophone Company and others continuing to do so outside of the US. Emile Berliner established Berliner Gramophone in Montreal, where he became Victor's Canadian distributor and held the rights in Canada to the "His Master's Voice" trademark.

Logo change
In February 1909, the company introduced new labels featuring the famous trademark known as "His Master's Voice", generally referred to as HMV, to distinguish them from earlier labels which featured an outline of the Recording Angel trademark. The latter had been designed by Theodore Birnbaum, an executive of the Gramophone Company pressing plant in Hanover, Germany. While the general public came to refer to the records and company as "His Master's Voice" or "HMV" because of the prominence of the phrase on the record labels, The Gramophone Company was never officially known as the HMV or His Master's Voice Company. The painting "His Master's Voice" was made in the 1890s with the dog Nipper listening to an Edison cylinder phonograph.
In 1899, Owen bought the painting from Francis Barraud, the artist, and asked him to paint out the Edison machine and substitute  a Gramophone, which he did. In 1900, Emile Berliner acquired the US rights to the painting and it became the trademark of the Victor Talking Machine Company in 1901. UK rights to the logo were reserved by Gramophone. Nipper the dog lived from 1884 to 1895 and is honoured in England with a celebrated grave marker.

Recording studios
In the mid-1920s, company chairman Trevor Osmond Williams approved funding for the company to secure property and build a recording studio, putting F. H. Dart from the company's technical recording department in charge of the project. Number 3 Abbey Road was acquired in 1929 and, after nearly 2 years of extensive renovations, the 3-studio facility that would come to be known as EMI Recording Studios (and eventually Abbey Road Studios) opened on November 12, 1931.

Formation of EMI
In March 1931, Gramophone merged with the English Columbia Graphophone Company to form Electric and Musical Industries Ltd (EMI). The "Gramophone Company, Ltd." name, however, continued to be used for many decades, especially for copyright notices on records. Gramophone Company of India was formed in 1946. The Gramophone Company Ltd legal entity was renamed EMI Records Ltd. in 1973.

Acoustic recordings 
From the 1890s to mid-1925, recordings were made without any electrical equipment, relying instead upon the energy inherent in the sound waves generated by the performers, to activate the recording apparatus.

See also 
 List of record labels
 EMI

 His Master's Voice (HMV)
 Sunrise Records
 For Your Entertainment (FYE)
 List of phonograph manufacturers
 Angel Records
 Nipper the dog, and logo variations
Addis v Gramophone Co Ltd [1909] UKHL 1

References

 Death of Gramophone Pioneer: Uxbridge & W. Drayton Gazette December 13, 1946
 John R. Bennett: A catalogue of vocal recordings from the English catalogues of the Gramophone Company 1898–1899, the Gramophone Company Limited 1899 - 1900, the Gramophone & Typewriter Company Limited 1901–1907 and the Gramophone Company Limited 1907 – 1925. England,Oakwood Press, 1956. Available at archive.org.(reprint: Westport, Conn.,USA, Greenwood Press, 1978. )
 Alan Kelly: His master's voice – La voce del padrone|the Italian catalogue; a complete numerical catalogue of Italian gramophone recordings made from 1898 to 1929 in Italy and elsewhere by the Gramophone Company Ltd..  New York; NY [et al.], Greenwood Press, 1988. 
 Alan Kelly: His master's voice, the French catalogue; a complete numerical catalogue of French gramophone recordings made from 1898 to 1929 in France and elsewhere by the Gramophone Company Ltd. New York; NY [et al.], Greenwood Press, 1990. 
 Alan Kelly: His master's voice, the German catalogue; a complete numerical catalogue of German gramophone recordings made from 1898 to 1929 in Germany, Austria, and elsewhere by The Gramophone Company Ltd. New York; NY [et al.], Greenwood Press, 1994. 
 Alan Kelly; Jacques Klöters: His master's voice, the Dutch catalogue; a complete numerical catalogue of Dutch and Belgian gramophone recordings made from 1900 to 1929 in Holland, Belgium, and elsewhere by the Gramophone Company Ltd. Westport, Conn. [et al.], Greenwood Press, 1997. 
 The voice, the magazine of the Gramophone Co., Ltd., Hayes, Middlesex, 1.1917 - 35.1954

External links
 The Gramophone Company's trademark gramophone 1898
 Kelly Online Database Searchable database of recordings made by the Gramophone Company, and its successor corporations during the 78 RPM era.

British record labels
Jazz record labels
1898 establishments in the United Kingdom
1931 disestablishments in the United Kingdom
Record labels established in 1898
Record labels disestablished in 1931
EMI
Phonograph manufacturers
Audio equipment manufacturers of the United Kingdom